Kasivishwanathan (born 28 January 1968) is an Indian film editor, who has worked on Tamil, Kannada and Malayalam language films.

Career
Kasivishwanathan entered the cinema industry as an assistant to Malayalam editor K. Narayanan. He later moved on to work as an associate editor in films like Thevar Magan (1992) and Kuruthipunal (1996) with N P. Satish. He later worked under A. Sreekar Prasad in films of several languages including Oriya, Sinhalese and Kannada.

He made his debut as an editor with Kamal Haasan's Aalavandhan (2001), experimenting with techniques involving animation and motion capture cameras, and then worked in the romantic comedy, Pammal K. Sambandam (2002). His work on his first film won him the Tamil Nadu State Film Award for Best Editor in the year 2004, for the year 2001. Kasivishwanthan subsequently went on to collaborate as an editor in several of Prakash Raj's productions with Duet Movies. Under the banner he worked in movies like Mozhi and Abiyum Nanum. He has since regularly collaborated with directors including Radha Mohan, Suseenthiran, Seenu Ramasamy  Sundar C Myskin and Siruthai Shiva's Veeram. Till date he works on projects with various directors, both established and debutant directors. 

In 2016, he made his debut as an actor with a role in Suseenthiran's Maaveeran Kittu (2016).

Filmography

As editor

 Aalavandhan (2001)
 Abhay (2001) Hindi
 Pammal K. Sambandam (2002)
 Punnagai Poove (2003)
 Raja Narasimha (2003) Kannada
 Naam (2003)
 Nee Mattum (2004)
 Vaanam Vasappadum (2004)
 Ponniyin Selvan (2005)
 Azhagiya Theeye (2005)
 Chinna (2005)
 Chithiram Pesuthadi (2006)
 Poi (2006)
 Thalai Nagaram (2006)
 Mozhi (2007)
 Veerappu (2007)
 Kovai Brothers (2007)
 Rendu (2007)
 Velli Thirai (2008)
 Aayudham Seivom (2008)
 Abhiyum Naanum (2008)
 Vennila Kabadi Kuzhu (2009)
 Vannathu Poochi (2009)
 Ainthaam Padai (2009)
 Naan Mahaan Alla (2010)
 Thaa (2010)
 Kattradhu Kalavu (2010)
 Thenmerku Paruvakaatru (2010)
 Magizhchi (2010)
 Panjamirtham (2010)
 Arumugam (2010)
 Kullanari Koottam (2011)
 Agilan (2011)
 Azhagarsamiyin Kuthirai (2011)
 Rajapattai (2011)
 Neerparavai (2012)
 Kaadu (2014)
 Veeram (2014)
 Idam Porul Eval (2014)
 Sivappu (2015)
 Dharma Durai (2016)
 Maaveeran Kittu (2016)
 Nenjil Thunivirundhal (2017)
 C/O Surya (2017) Telugu
 Aan Devathai (2018)
 Merku Thodarchi Malai (2018)
 Kanne Kalaimaane (2019)
 Nedunalvaadai (2019)
 100% Kadhal (2019)
 Kasada Thapara (2021)
 Endraavathu Oru Naal (2021)
 Veerapandiyapuram (2022)
 Kuttram Kuttrame (2022)
 Pagaivanuku Arulvai (2022)
 Karottiyin Kadhali (2022)
 Bumper (2023)
 Malai (2023)

As actor
 Maaveeran Kittu (2016)
 Dharmadurai (2016)

References

External links
 

Living people
Malayalam film editors
Tamil film editors
Kannada film editors
1968 births